Bengt Linders (4 June 1904 – 25 December 1984) was a Swedish swimmer. He competed in the men's 200 metre breaststroke event at the 1924 Summer Olympics.

References

External links
 

1904 births
1984 deaths
Olympic swimmers of Sweden
Swimmers at the 1924 Summer Olympics
Swimmers from Stockholm
Swedish male breaststroke swimmers